Alex Torrance may refer to:

Sandy Torrance (Alexander Torrance, 1901–1941), Scottish footballer 
Alex A. Torrance ("Big Alex"), Scottish curler
Alex F. Torrance ("Wee Alex"), Scottish curler